Ian Law (born 27 September 1938) is a former Australian rules footballer who played for the Hawthorn Football Club in the Victorian Football League (VFL).

A rover, Law won the Hawthorn Best and fairest award in just his second year of VFL football and also finished third in the 1961 Brownlow Medal count. He played in Hawthorn's 1961 premiership team and was Club Champion twice more before retiring after the 1968 season.

In the early 1960s, he played four first-class cricket matches for Victoria as a specialist batsman.

Honours and achievements
Hawthorn
 VFL premiership player: 1961
 2× Minor premiership: 1961, 1963

Individual
 3× Hawthorn best and fairest: 1961, 1963, 1964
 Hawthorn Hall of Fame
 Hawthorn life member

References

Living people
1938 births
Hawthorn Football Club players
Hawthorn Football Club Premiership players
Old Scotch Football Club players
Peter Crimmins Medal winners
Australian cricketers
Victoria cricketers
Australian rules footballers from Melbourne
Cricketers from Victoria (Australia)
One-time VFL/AFL Premiership players